The Blue Dot Network (BDN) is a multi-stakeholder initiative formed by the United States, Japan, and Australia to provide assessment and certification of infrastructure development projects worldwide on measures of financial transparency, environmental sustainability, and impact on economic development, with the goal of mobilizing private capital to invest abroad. 

It was initially led by the U.S. International Development Finance Corporation (DFC), Japan Bank for International Cooperation, and Department of Foreign Affairs and Trade of Australia.

In June 2021, the Group of Seven (G7) announced the adoption of the Build Back Better World (B3W) initiative to counter China's BRI. Thereafter, the Blue Dot Network was co-opted into the B3W initiative.

Founding

On  4 November 2019, U.S Under Secretary of State Keith Krach formally launched the Blue Dot Network with his Australia and Japan counterparts at the Indo-Pacific Business Forum (IPBF) in Bangkok, Thailand on the sidelines of the 35th ASEAN Summit. It was led by the U.S. International Development Finance Corporation, Japan Bank for International Cooperation, and Department of Foreign Affairs and Trade of Australia.

Krach made three major related announcements in energy, infrastructure and digital initiatives which consisted of a new multilateral infrastructure initiative unveiled by the U.S., the signing of a $10 billion agreement strengthening the Japan-U.S. Strategic Energy Partnership; and the plan to spur digitally driven economic growth economic in the Indo-Pacific. In all three economic pillars, Under Secretary Krach engaged in US-ASEAN Business Council and U.S. Chamber of Commerce by implementing advanced U.S. efforts in establishing a set of global trust standards.

History

On 4 November 2019, U.S Under Secretary of State Keith Krach formally launched the Blue Dot Network with his Australia and Japan counterparts with access to $60 billion of capital from the DFC at the Indo-Pacific Business Forum.

On 29 January 2020, Blue Dot Network's steering committee holds its first meeting in Washington with US, Australia and Japan. Under Secretary Krach commits $2 million of U.S State Department seed money for the steering committee and issues a public invitation to all other G-7 members to come on board.

On 25 February 2020, the Blue Dot Network is incorporated in the India-U.S. Comprehensive Global Strategic Partnership Joint Statement.

On 20 November 2020, Taiwan joins the Blue Dot Network with the signing of the U.S.-Taiwan Economic Prosperity Partnership (EPP) between Taiwan Minister John Deng and Under Secretary of State Keith Krach at the EPP Dialogue's inaugural meeting in Washington.

On 19 October 2020, on behalf of the Twelve Three Seas nations, President Kersti Kaljulaid endorses the Blue Dot Network and the Clean Network at the Three Seas Summit in Tallinn, Estonia. U.S. Under Secretary of State Krach commits a $1 billion investment with the initial investment of $300 million in trusted clean infrastructure, as described in the Blue Dot standards for roads, bridges, railways, 5G, ports, and energy projects in the Three Seas region between the Baltic, Adriatic, and Black seas. The goal is to stimulate investments by each member country.

On 14 January 2021, Georgia adopts the Blue Dot Network as part of joining the Clean Network Alliance of Democracies at the signing ceremony between Georgian Minister of Economy and Sustainable Development Natia Turnava and US Under Secretary of State Keith Krach.

On 7 June 2021, the OECD commits to supporting the Blue Dot Network at meeting of the Executive Consultation Group in Paris, France.

On 12 June 2021, the Group of Seven (G7) announced the adoption of the Build Back Better World (B3W) initiative built off the progress and principles of the Blue Dot Network to counter China's BRI.

See also 
 Transport in Australia
 Transport in Japan
 Transport in the United States
 Quadrilateral Security Dialogue
 The Clean Network
 Build Back Better World
Equator Principles

References

Infrastructure in Asia
Foreign direct investment
Geopolitical rivalry